The Croatian National Theatre in Mostar is a theatre located in Mostar, home to the largest population of Croats in Bosnia and Herzegovina.

HNK Mostar was established on September 22, 1994 and the foundations of its building were laid on January 30, 1996. In July 2011 the building was still undergoing construction and was incomplete. Croatian and local dramas are performed on the small stage in the basement (which is completed) and it is also the venue of the Croatian Puppet Theatre. Some of its goals include the promotion of Croatian culture in Bosnia and Herzegovina and abroad, as well as hosting international theatre troupes. All of its plays and performances are held on the small stage located in the building's basement. Half of its funding comes from the budget of Herzegovina-Neretva Canton (50%), while the other half comes from sponsors and donors. It currently has 25 employees and its theatre director (as of September 3, 2014) is Ivan Vukoja.

See also 
Sarajevo National Theatre
Croatian National Theatre in Zagreb
 National Theatre Mostar

References

1994 establishments in Bosnia and Herzegovina
Theatres in Bosnia and Herzegovina
Buildings and structures in Mostar
Theatre companies in Bosnia and Herzegovina